Portraits in Moonlight is a collection of stories by American author Carl Jacobi. It was released during 1964 by Arkham House with an edition of 1,987 copies and was the author's second collection published by Arkham House.  Half of the stories had been published originally in the magazine Weird Tales. Some of the stories are science fiction. The volume is dedicated to the memory of Jacobi's father.

Contents

Portraits in Moonlight features the following tales:

 "Portrait in Moonlight"
 "Witches in the Cornfield"
 "The Martian Calendar"
 "The Corbie Door"
 "Tepondicon"
 "Incident at the Galloping Horse"
 "Made in Tanganyika"
 "Matthew South and Company"
 "Long Voyage"
 "The Historian"
 "Lodana"
 "The Lorenzo Watch"
 "The La Prello Paper"
 "The Spanish Camera"

Sources

1964 short story collections
Fantasy short story collections
Horror short story collections
Science fiction short story collections by Carl Jacobi
Pulp stories
Arkham House books